Annette's Perfect Cleanser Company was a 1930s era  firm which manufactured a dry powder which was useful for removing spots and stains from clothing. Packages of the powder sold for $0.10, $0.25, and $0.50 in 1932. 

The F.W. Woolworth Company featured the cleaning item in full window displays. Based in Boston, Massachusetts, Annette's Perfect Cleanser Company was acquired by Zonite Products Corporation in March
1932.

Succession
In January 1937 Zonite Products Corporation notified the New York Stock Exchange that it was dissolving its fully owned subsidiaries, including Annette's Perfect Cleanser Company. As of December 31, 1936, Zonite Products Corporation succeeded to all of the assets and assumed all of the obligations of its subsidiaries.

References

External links
Cleaning Products

Laundry detergents
Defunct companies based in Massachusetts
Manufacturing companies based in Boston
Manufacturing companies disestablished in 1932
1932 disestablishments in Massachusetts
1932 mergers and acquisitions